Sander Arends and David Pel were the defending champions but chose not to defend their title.

Fabian Fallert and Hendrik Jebens won the title after defeating Jonathan Eysseric and Denys Molchanov 7–6(7–2), 6–3 in the final.

Seeds

Draw

References

External links
 Main draw

Koblenz Open - Doubles
2023 Doubles